Meridolum benneti is a species of air-breathing land snails, terrestrial pulmonate gastropod mollusks in the family Camaenidae. This species is endemic to Australia.

References

Gastropods of Australia
benneti
Vulnerable fauna of Australia
Gastropods described in 1872
Taxonomy articles created by Polbot
Taxobox binomials not recognized by IUCN